Eric Andreas Hilgendorf (born 3 December 1960 in Stuttgart) is a German professor of law and legal philosopher.  He holds  the Chair in Criminal Law, Criminal Procedure, Legal Theory, and Information and Computer Science Law at the University of Würzburg. Hilgendorf is one of Germany's most influential scholars in the field of criminal law, with special focuses on IT law as well as on artificial intelligence and law.

Academic background 
After graduating from high school in Ansbach in 1980, Hilgendorf entered the University of Tübingen, where he studied a range of subjects including philosophy, modern history, religious studies, and law.  He was awarded his BA/MA degree with concentrations in philosophy and history upon submission of his master's thesis entitled the History of the Parliamentary Freedom of Speech in Germany.  In 1990 he completed his PhD in Philosophy with submission of the study Argumentation in Jurisprudence, and was awarded his second PhD, in the field of Law, for his thesis entitled Criminal Production Liability in the Society of Risk.  In 1997 he completed the dissertation for his habilitation On the Distinction of Factual Statements and Value Judgments in Criminal Law, which focused on criminal law, criminal procedure, and legal philosophy.

Following his habilitation, Hilgendorf was appointed and served as professor of criminal law at the University of Constance from 1997 to 2001, serving there as Dean from 1999 to 2001.  Since 2001 he has taught at the Julius-Maximilian University of Würzburg, where he holds the Chair in Criminal Law, Criminal Justice, Legal Theory, Information and Computer Science Law.  He served as Dean of the Würzburg Law Faculty from October 2010 to September 2012.

Academic career 
Hilgendorf's main areas of interest are German and European medical law, computer- and Internet criminal law, law and technology and comparative law. He is also active in basic legal research including work in the subfields of legal philosophy, legal theory, bioethics, history of legal thought, the history of criminal law, and human dignity. He is regarded as a pioneer in the field of e-learning in law and from 2005 to 2009 was a member of the Commission on Virtual Higher Education in Bavaria.

Among his distinctions, Hilgendorf is a member of the Association of Criminal Law Teachers (professors) and the European Society for Analytic Philosophy, a correspondent of the Hans Kelsen Society in Vienna, and a member of the Scientific Advisory Committee of the Giordano Bruno Foundation. In addition, he is a member of the Deutsche Akademie für Technikwissenschaften (Acatech) (German Academy for Technological Sciences). Hilgendorf has been called upon several times to advise the German Parliament and federal government on matters of criminal law, medical law, and Internet crime. Since 2014, Hilgendorf has served as co-editor of the renowned JuristenZeitung.

Professor Hilgendorf has also been a spokesperson for Würzburg's Center for Foundational Legal Research.  He heads the University of Würzburg’s project "Global Systems and Intercultural Competence" (GSIK), which focuses on teaching students of all faculties how to recognize, analyze, and resolve intercultural conflict. This program has included a number of sub-projects focusing on international comparative law. He was one of the organizers of an international team of researchers at the Center for Interdisciplinary Research (ZIF) in Bielefeld, Germany.

Hilgendorf is involved in the field of international legal development through his cooperation with universities in Turkey, the Caucasus (mainly Azerbaijan), Latin America, and East Asia (China, Korea and Japan), for example establishing a strong working relationship with Peking University Law School. In 2010, together with Professor Genlin Liang of the Peking University, he founded the Chinese-German Federation of Criminal Law Professors (CDSV), whose goal is to promote academic exchange between the two countries. Since then, the CDSV has become one of the most important academic platforms for cooperation in criminal law between Germany and China.

In 2013, Hilgendorf was invited as visiting professor at the Law Faculty of the Peking University. Peking University has awarded him the title of honorary professor. Since 2018, he is member of the "Global Faculty" of Peking University Law School. In the same year. he received an honorary professorship from Renmin University Law School. In 2014, he was a guest professor at Hebrew University, Jerusalem.

In 2010, Hilgendorf founded the Forschungsstelle Robotrecht, a well-known research centre addressing legal issues related to autonomous systems in industrial processes, transport and private life. Autonomous driving raises questions of civil and criminal liability, protection of privacy and matters of registration for road use. From 2013 to 2017, he was head of the pan-European legal research group of AdaptIVe, an EU-funded research project on the development of autonomous vehicles. In 2016, he was appointed by Federal Minister of Transport and Digital Infrastructure Alexander Dobrindt to serve on the German government's Ethics Commission on Autonomous Driving. Since 2019, Hilgendorf has been co-director of the newly founded Bavarian Research Institute for Digital Transformation (BIDT) situated in Munich. Moreover, he was member of the European High Level Expert Group on Artificial Intelligence (EU HLEG on AI).

Hilgendorf is also the chairperson of the Juristen ALUMNI Würzburg, the University of Würzburg Law Faculty's alumni relations program.

Publications 
Hilgendorf is the author of numerous books, essays, and annotations. Many of his works have been translated into other languages such as English, Spanish, Portuguese, Chinese, Japanese, Korean, Turkish and Greek. Among his works are (with English translation):

Argumentation in der Jurisprudenz. Zur Rezeption von analytischer Philosophie und kritischer Theorie in der Grundlagenforschung der Jurisprudenz (Argumentation in Jurisprudence: On the Reception of Analytical Philosophy and Critical Theory in the Basic Research of Jurisprudence), Tübingen, Univ., Diss., 1990, Duncker & Humblot Berlin 1991 
Die Entwicklungsgeschichte der parlamentarischen Redefreiheit in Deutschland (Historical Development of the Parliamentary Freedom of Speech in Germany), Peter Lang Frankfurt am Main 1991
Hans Albert zur Einführung (Hans Albert: an Introduction), Junius, Hamburg 1997 (Zur Einführung, 143)
Wissenschaftlicher Humanismus. Texte zur Moral- und Rechtsphilosophie des frühen logischen Empirismus (Scientific Humanism: Essays on the Moral- and Legal Philosophy of early Logical Empiricism), Haufe Verlag, Freiburg 1998 (Haufe-Schriftenreihe zur rechtswissenschaftlichen Grundlagenforschung, Bd. 12)
Fallsammlung zum Strafrecht. (Casebook on Criminal Law: General and Special Parts), 3 Vols., 2020
dtv - Atlas Recht Bd. 1. Grundlagen, Staatsrecht, Strafrecht (dtv - Atlas of Law Vol. 1. Foundations of Constitutional and Criminal Law), Deutscher Taschenbuchverlag, Munich 2003, 2. Ed. 2008
dtv - Atlas Recht Bd. 2 Verwaltungsrecht, Zivilrecht (dtv – Atlas of Law Vol. 2 Administrative Law, Civil Law), Deutscher Taschenbuchverlag, Munich 2008
Strafrecht Besonderer Teil (Criminal Law Special Part), Gieseking Verlag, 4. Ed. Bielefeld 2021 (together with author Bernd Heinrich)
Die deutschsprachige Strafrechtswissenschaft in Selbstdarstellungen (German Criminal Legal Science as it Sees Itself), Vol. 1, 2010, Vol 2, 2018 (Editor)
Ostasiatisches Strafrecht (East Asian Criminal Law), Tübingen 2010 (Editor)
 Handbuch des deutschen Strafrechts (Handbook of German Criminal Law), Vols. 1 -9, Heidelberg 2018 - 2023 (editor, together with co-editors Hans Kudlich and Brian Valerius)
Medizinstrafrecht (Medical Criminal Law), 2. Ed. 2019
Lehr- und Praxiskommentar Strafrecht (Commentary on Criminal Law for Teachers and Practitioners of Law''), 9. Ed. 2021

References

External links 
 Literature from and on Professor Eric Hilgendorf in the catalogues of the German National Library
 Department of Criminal Law, Criminal Justice, Legal Theory, Information and Computer Science Law at the University of Würzburg
 Full list of publications
 Project Homepage of Global Systems and Intercultural Competence
 Homepage of the Juristen ALUMNI Würzburg

1960 births
Living people
Jurists from Stuttgart
German legal scholars
20th-century German lawyers
Academic staff of the University of Würzburg
21st-century German lawyers